The Ligue de Baseball Majeur du Québec (LBMQ) is a senior (over 21) amateur baseball league in the Canadian province of Quebec. It is the highest level of non-professional baseball in the province of Quebec.

History
The league is the result of the 2002 amalgamation of several men's senior elite level baseball teams in the province of Quebec. The league from Montreal, the Ligue de Baseball Senior de Montréal, merged with those of the Quebec City and Trois-Rivières areas. There were originally ten teams, five from the Montreal area, four from Quebec City and one from Trois-Rivières. A year later, the senior-level league teams from the Estrie and Bas-Saint-Laurent leagues joined bringing the total up to 15. In 2009, the league became the sole senior elite baseball league in Quebec when the Ligue de Baseball Senior Majeur du Québec folded, and its four teams joined the LBEQ.

In 2004, the LBSEQ became the first in Quebec to use wooden baseball bats exclusively. Other competitive levels of play in Quebec have since followed suit (senior, junior and midget).

In its seven years of existence, the LBSEQ has represented Quebec in the Baseball Canada Senior Men's Championship each year and has earned four medals. These were a bronze in 2002, a gold in 2003, a bronze in 2004 and a silver in 2008.

The LBSEQ a well traveled league has also participated in various tournaments outside of Quebec.  In 2008, they played in the 4 Nations Cup in Liège against professional teams from Belgium and England.  In 2009, the LBSEQ participated in a tournament in Rouen, France hosted by the local team the Huskies, along with teams from Germany, the USA and the French national team.  In 2008, the league participated in and won the Vintage Base Ball World Series in Massachusetts. It competed against the Intercounty Baseball League of Ontario in the 2010 New Era All-Star Classic.

In 2013, with the league's growing caliber and reputation, the league's leaders made the decision to rename it the Ligue de baseball majeur du Québec (LBMQ).

Teams

Champions
2022: Thetford Mines Blue Sox
2021: Shawinigan Cascades
2020: Victoriaville Cactus
2019: Thetford Mines Blue Sox
2018: Thetford Mines Blue Sox
2017: Acton Vale Castors
2016: Thetford Mines Blue Sox
2015: Thetford Mines Blue Sox
2014: Thetford Mines Blue Sox
2013: Thetford Mines Blue Sox
2012: Thetford Mines Blue Sox
2011: Acton Vale Castors
2010: St-Jérôme TPX
2009: Sherbrooke Expos
2008: Trois-Rivières Vertdure
2007: Victoriaville 4*44
2006: Rivière-du-Loup Ciel
2005: Rivière-du-Loup Ciel
2004: Sherbrooke Indiens
2003: Montreal
2002: Laval

See also
Baseball awards#Canada

References

External links
LBMQ.ca

Summer baseball leagues
1
2002 establishments in Quebec
Sports leagues established in 2002